Woodington may refer to:
 Woodington, Ontario, a community in Muskoka Lakes, Ontario, Canada
 Woodington, Hampshire, a United Kingdom location
 Woodington, North Carolina, a township in Lenoir County, North Carolina, United States
 Woodington, Ohio, an unincorporated community in Ohio, United States

People with the surname
 William F. Woodington, English painter and sculptor